This is a list of songs which reached number one on the Billboard Mainstream Top 40 (or Pop Airplay) chart in 2023.

Chart history

See also 
 2023 in American music

References

External links 
 Current Billboard Pop Songs chart

Billboard charts
Mainstream Top 40 2023
United States Mainstream Top 40